Graisse may refer to:
 the French word for fat or grease
 Graisse, a grape variety
 Graisse (fault), a wine fault due to abnormal bacterial mallolactic fermentation